Rakovnik is a village next to Goričane in the Municipality of Medvode in the Upper Carniola region of Slovenia.

References

External links

Rakovnik on Geopedia

Populated places in the Municipality of Medvode